Nianimaru Forest Park  is a forest park in the Gambia. Established on January 1, 1954, it covers 607 hectares. 

It is located in Central River, Gambia. The estimated terrain elevation above sea level is four metres.

The Nianimaru Forest Park is located in a region where numerous Senegambian stone circles can be found, including the stone circles of Niani Maru.

References

Protected areas established in 1954
Forest parks of the Gambia